The Browncroft Historic District is a national historic district located in the Browncroft neighborhood of Rochester, New York.  The district contains 518 contributing buildings, two contributing sites, two contributing objects, and two contributing structures over 116 acres.  It includes 417 residential properties constructed between 1914 and World War II.

The neighborhood's original developer, Charles J. Brown, former president of the National Nurserymen's Association, gave it its name.  It was declared a National Historic District and added to the National Register of Historic Places in 2004.  The district is "recognized for the architectural integrity of the homes, a landscape design that features uniform plantings of flowering shrubs and shade trees, and its role in the development of Rochester."

Description
The historic district includes only certain designated properties located in a subsection of the neighborhood approximately circumscribed by Browncroft Boulevard on the North, Newcastle Road on the east, Blossom Road on the south, and Winton Road on the west.

Unofficial landmarks within the historic district include:
Two of the development's original wrought iron street signposts (Located at the corner of Ramsey Park and Corwin Road and at the corner of Windemere and Newcastle Roads).
The house at 273 Dorchester Road which contains columns from the original nursery office before its demolition.
The house at 540 North Winton Road, the original farmhouse of Steven M. Corwin, which later served as Brown's home.

Gallery

References

External links
National Register of Historic Places listing
Landmark Society of Western New York neighborhood page
District historic photos

20th-century architecture in the United States
Historic districts in Rochester, New York
Historic districts on the National Register of Historic Places in New York (state)
National Register of Historic Places in Rochester, New York